Balbissa was a town of ancient Cappadocia, inhabited in Byzantine times. The name Balbissa does not occur in ancient authors but is inferred from epigraphic and other evidence.

Its site is located near Yaylaköy, Asiatic Turkey.

References

Populated places in ancient Cappadocia
Former populated places in Turkey
Populated places of the Byzantine Empire
History of Niğde Province